McCracken Township is an inactive township in Christian County, in the U.S. state of Missouri.

McCracken Township was established in 1886, and named after McCracken, Missouri.

References

Townships in Missouri
Townships in Christian County, Missouri